Tõnu Õim (born 16 June 1941) is an Estonian grandmaster of correspondence chess, most famous for being the first to have won the ICCF World Championship twice, in 1983 and 1999. In 1991 he won the Axelson Memorial. In  play, he was awarded the Soviet Master title in 1966. He does not hold a FIDE title for over-the-board play; however, his peak FIDE rating of 2410 indicates a player of International Master strength.

Notable games
 Tonu Oim vs. Grigory Konstantinovich Sanakoev, 50th World Champions Jubilee Tournament 2003, Sicilian Defense: Najdorf Variation, English Attack (B90), 
 Tonu Oim vs. Juan Sebastian Morgado, 14th CC World Ch Final 1994, Four Knights Game: Scotch Variation. Accepted (C47), 1–0

Notes

References

External links
 
 
 

1941 births
Living people
Correspondence chess grandmasters
World Correspondence Chess Champions
Estonian chess players
Soviet chess players
People from Raasiku Parish